Tilekmat is a settlement in the Issyk-Kul Region of Kyrgyzstan. It is part of the Jeti-Ögüz District. The settlement was named for Tilekmat Jylkyaydar uulu (Tilekmat Ake), Kyrgyz politician, people's diplomat and talented thinker, who was buried near it. Its population was 3,306 in 2021.

Population

References

Populated places in Issyk-Kul Region